Henonemus is a genus of pencil catfishes native to South America.

Taxonomy 
Though the monophyly of Henonemus has previously been in doubt, leading to this genus being placed in synonymy with Stegophilus. However, monophyly has been argued for in 2006 and the genus was also recognized in a 2007 checklist of catfishes.

Species
There are currently five recognized species in this genus:
 Henonemus intermedius (Eigenmann & Eigenmann, 1889)
 Henonemus macrops (Steindachner, 1882)
 Henonemus punctatus (Boulenger, 1887)
 Henonemus taxistigmus (Fowler, 1914)
 Henonemus triacanthopomus DoNascimiento & Provenzano, 2006

Distribution 
H. intermedius originates from the Araguaia River basin in Brazil. H. macrops and H. punctatus both are known from the Amazon River basin, the former from Brazil and the latter from Brazil, Ecuador, and Peru. H. taxistigmus inhabits the Rupununi River basin in Guyana. H. triacanthopomus has been collected in the Apure and Arauca Rivers and in Caño Macareo in the Orinoco Delta, but is probably distributed through the entire middle and lower reaches of the Orinoco River basin.

Description 
Fish of the genus Henonemus have an opercle with two odontodes (though H. triacanthopomus differs from other Henonemus in that there are three or four odontodes in specimens greater than 80 millimetres or 3.1 in SL) and the teeth of the most posterior row on the premaxilla and the dentary proximally turned to the midline then abruptly bent laterally in the distal half, and arranged in a compact band. They may grow about 4.1–9.4 centimetres (1.6–3.7 in) SL.

References

Trichomycteridae
Fish of South America
Fish of the Amazon basin
Fauna of Brazil
Fauna of Ecuador
Vertebrates of Guyana
Vertebrates of Peru
Freshwater fish genera
Catfish genera
Taxa named by Carl H. Eigenmann